Babangida is a Nigerian surname. Notable people with the surname include:

Ibrahim Babangida, former military ruler of Nigeria
Maryam Babangida, former first lady of Nigeria
Three footballer brothers
Tijani Babangida (born 1973), Nigerian footballer
Ibrahim Babangida (footballer) (born 1976), Nigerian footballer
Haruna Babangida (born 1982), Nigerian footballer